In 2001, during the centennial celebration of the National Association of Professional Baseball Leagues, Minor League Baseball tasked baseball historians Bill Weiss and Marshall Wright to develop a list of the top 100 best minor league baseball teams of the century. Their list includes 69 distinct franchises from across the United States and in Canada and Mexico. There are representatives from every decade of the century.

Weiss and Wright developed a statistical formula to evaluate teams. First, a rating was given to each league. They assigned 100 points for Triple-A leagues down to 20 points for Class D leagues. The equivalent classifications of each league were used to adjust for changes in the minor league structure since 1900. Next, individual teams were graded based on winning percentage and total wins in order to assess each team's strength against its league and its season-long performance. The combination of these three metrics resulted in a statistical list of the century's top teams. Weiss and Wright further took into account intangibles such as winning a pennant, significant achievements, or reputation in creating their final list.

Of the 69 franchises to make the list, 14 appeared more than once. The Baltimore Orioles took 6 places on the list, the most of any team, followed by the Ft. Worth Panthers and Toronto Maple Leafs (5), Newark Bears and San Francisco Seals (4); Kansas City Blues, Los Angeles Angels, and St. Paul Saints (3); and Charlotte Hornets, Columbus Senators/Red Birds, Houston Buffaloes, Indianapolis Indians, Memphis Chicks, and Milwaukee Brewers (2). Thirty leagues are represented on the list. The league with the most entrants is the International League with 17. The other top leagues are the American Association (13); Pacific Coast League (10); Eastern League and Texas League (8); California League, Western Association, and Western League (4). Thirty-one teams competed at the Double-A classification level, the most of any class, followed by Class A (24); Class C (12); Class B (11); Triple-A (10); Class D (7); Class A1 and independent (2); and Class A-Advanced (1). Twenty-seven teams competed in the 1920s, the most of any decade, followed by the 1940s (16); 1930s (13); 1900s and 1950s (10); 1910s and 1980s (6); 1970s (5); 1990s (4); and 1960s (3).

The list

See also

References

External links
Top 100 Teams
About the Top 100 Teams

Top 100
National Base